Devdariani is a surname. Notable people with the surname include:

Gaioz Devdariani (1901–1938), Georgian revolutionary
David Devdariani (1927–2006), Georgian law professor
Davit Devdariani (born 1987), Georgian footballer
Seit Devdariani (1879–1937), Georgian philosopher